Some religions have perspectives on tattooing.

Buddhism
Southeast Asia has a tradition of protective tattoos known as sak yant or yantra tattoos that incorporate Buddhist symbols and images, as well as protective mantras or sutra verses in antique Khmer script. These tattoos are sometimes applied by Buddhist monks or practitioners of indigenous spiritual traditions. Traditionally, tattoos that included images of the Buddha or other religious figures were only applied to certain parts of the body, and sometimes required commitment on the part of the recipient to observe the Five Precepts or other traditional customs. Incorporation of images of the Buddha into tattoos that do not comply with traditional norms for respectful display have been a cause of controversy in a number of traditional Buddhist countries, where the display of images of this type by Westerners may be regarded as appropriation and has resulted in barred entry or deportation of individuals displaying tattoos of this type.

Christianity

Some Christians take issue with tattooing, upholding the Hebrew prohibition. The Hebrew prohibition is based on interpreting Leviticus 19:28—"Ye shall not make any cuttings in your flesh for the dead, nor print any marks upon you"—so as to prohibit tattoos.

Interpretations of the passage vary, however. Some believe that it refers specifically to, and exclusively prohibits, an ancient form of self-mutilation during mourning (as discussed in the Judaism section). Under this interpretation, tattooing is permitted to Jews and Christians. Another interpretation is that it refers only to the tattooing of ink with ashes of deceased family.

Others hold that the prohibition of Leviticus 19:28, regardless of its interpretation, is not binding upon Christians—just as prohibitions like "nor shall there come upon you a garment of cloth made of two kinds of stuff" (Leviticus 19:19) are not binding—because it is part of the Jewish ceremonial law, binding only upon the Jewish people (see ).

Catholicism 
In the Catholic Church during the Crusades, it was ruled in the Council of Northumberland that religious tattoos were permissible, and even "praiseworthy". At the time, many Catholic knights and pilgrims made use of tattoos, especially at the completion of a pilgrimage to the Catholic shrines in the Holy Land. Some Catholic military orders, such as the Knights of St. John of Malta, sported tattoos to show their allegiance. However in some regions, a decline often occurred in other cultures following European efforts to convert aboriginal and indigenous people to Western religious and cultural practices that held tribal tattooing to be a "pagan" or "heathen" activity. Within some traditional indigenous cultures, tattooing takes place within the context of a rite of passage between adolescence and adulthood (without any explicit religious subtext).

Catholic Croats of Bosnia and Herzegovina utilised tattooing of crosses for perceived protection against forced conversion to Islam and enslavement during the Ottoman occupation of Bosnia and Herzegovina (see Christian tattooing in Bosnia and Herzegovina). This form of tattooing continued long past its original motivation. Tattooing was performed during springtime or during special religious celebrations such as the Feast of St. Joseph, and consisted mostly of Christian crosses on hands, fingers, forearms, and below the neck and on the chest.

Eastern and Oriental Orthodoxy 
Orthodox Coptic Christians who live in Egypt commonly tattoo themselves with the symbols of Coptic crosses on their right wrists for similar historical reasons. From there, the tradition spread throughout Eastern Christian communities such as the Ethiopian, Armenian, Syriac and Maronite Churches. Commemorative tattoos are also traditionally done on pilgrims who complete a visit to Jerusalem.

Hinduism
Tattoos are allowed culturally and religiously; contemporary tattoos are common among traditional Hindus. Historical roots date back to the practice of Mehndi using Henna.

Islam

Scholars who claim that tattooing is a sin support their view by pointing to hadiths such as one in Sahih al-Bukhari narrated by Abu Juhayfah that declares "The Prophet cursed the one who does tattoos and the one who has a tattoo done." These scholars generally do not hold the view that non-permanent tattoos such as henna are sinful; nor do they claim that converts to Islam who had tattoos prior to conversion need to get those tattoos removed. Turkish professor of religious studies Remzi Kuscular states that tattoos are sinful but that they do not violate a Muslim's . Canadian Islamic scholar Sheikh Ahmad Kutty states that tattooing prohibitions exist in Islam to protect Muslims from HIV/AIDS, hepatitis, and other diseases that can be transferred to people through tattoos.

History 
Göran Larsson, a Swedish professor in religious studies, states that there are "both historical and contemporary examples indicating that, at different times and in different places, [tattooing] was practiced by certain Islamic groups." Al-Tabari mentions in History of the Prophets and Kings that the hands of Asma bint Umais were tattooed. Muslims in Africa, Syria, Saudi Arabia, Iran and West Pakistan have used tattoos for beautification, prophylaxis, and the prevention of diseases.

Edward William Lane described the tattooing customs of Egyptian Muslim women in his 1836 book, An Account of the Manners and Customs of the Modern Egyptians. In a 1909 trip to Persia, Percy Sykes observed Shia Muslim women had "birds, owers, or gazelles tattooed, but occasionally verses from the Qur'an" and that victorious male wrestlers and gymnasts were honored with the tattooing of a lion on the arm. In a 1965 article published in the journal Man: A Record of Anthropological Science, author John Carswell documented that Sunni and Shia Muslims in Lebanon would get tattoos of the swords of Abu Bakr and Ali, respectively, to distinguish themselves from one another.

According to historians Shoshana-Rose Marzel and Guy Stiebel, face tattoos were common among Muslim women until the 1950s but have since fallen out of fashion. Traditional Tunisian tattoos include eagles, the sun, the moon, and stars. Tattoos were also used in the Ottoman Empire due to the influx of Algerian sailors in the 17th century. Bedouin and Kurdish women have a long tradition of tattooed bodies.

Margo DeMello, a cultural anthropologist and professor at Canisius College, notes that tattoos are still common in some parts of the Muslim world such as Iraq, Afghanistan, Morocco, Algeria, and Egypt. Underground tattoos have also been gaining popularity among Iranian youth. Some Turkish youth get tattoos as a form of resistance, fashion, or as part of a counterculture. Tattoos are also gaining popularity among young Muslims in the West.

 Muslims believe that tattooing is a sin, because it involves changing the natural creation of God, inflicting unnecessary pain in the process. Tattoos are classified as dirty things, which is prohibited in Islam. They believe that a dirty body will directly lead to a dirty mind and will destroy their , ritual ablution. Some Shafi'i scholars such as Amjad Rasheed argue that tattooing causes impurity and that tattoos were prohibited by the Prophet Muhammad. Blood is viewed as an impure substance, so a person with a tattoo cannot engage in several religious practices. However, in the present day, it is possible to get a tattoo without mixing dye with blood after it exits onto the outer surface of the body, leaving a possibility for a Muslim to wear a tattoo and perform a valid prayer. Scholar Yusuf al-Qaradawi states that tattoos are sinful because they are an expression of vanity and they alter the physical creation of God. According to the online South African Deobandi  service called Ask-the-Imam, Muslims should remove any tattoos they have if possible or cover them in some way.

Shia Islam 
Shia Ayatollahs Ali al-Sistani and Ali Khamenei believe there are no authoritative Islamic prohibitions on tattoos. The Quran does not mention tattoos or tattooing at all.

Grand Ayatollah Sadiq Hussaini Shirazi ruled: "Tattoos are considered  (reprehensible but not forbidden). However, it is not permissible to have Quranic verses, names of Ahlulbayt (a.s), drawings of Imams (a.s), Hadiths, unislamic and inappropriate images or the likes tattooed onto the body. And if the ink was the type that remains above the skin, then it would be considered prohibited. However, if it was of the type to go beneath the skin, it would be considered permissible but ."

Judaism 

Tattoos are generally forbidden in Judaism based on the Torah (Leviticus 19:28): "You shall not make gashes in your flesh for the dead, or incise any marks on yourselves: I am the Lord." The prohibition is explained by contemporary rabbis as part of a general prohibition on body modification (with the exception of circumcision) that does not serve a medical purpose (such as to correct a deformity). Maimonides, a leading 12th-century scholar of Jewish law and thought, explains that one of the reasons for the prohibition against tattoos is a Jewish response to pagan mourning practices.

Scholars such as John Huehnergard and Harold Liebowitz suggest that the prohibition against tattooing was less in response to the pagan mourning practices as mentioned in the preceding verse of Leviticus, as death rituals in ancient Mesopotamia, Syria, Israel, and Egypt make no references to marking the skin as a sign of mourning. However tattooing was used a sign of enslavement and servitude in ancient Egypt, where captives were tattooed or branded with the names of priests and pharaohs to mark them as belonging to a specific person or god. Huehnergard and Liebowitz therefore suggest that tattooing was forbidden in the Torah because it was a symbol of servitude and the primacy of escaping Egyptian bondage in ancient Jewish theological law. They also point out the verse Isaiah 44:5 in which the children of Jacob committing themselves to God: "One shall say, 'I am the 's'...

Orthodox Jews, in application of halakha (Jewish Law), reveal Leviticus 19:28 prohibits getting tattoos. One reading of Leviticus is to apply it only to the specific ancient practice of rubbing the ashes of the dead into wounds; but modern tattooing is included in other religious interpretations. Orthodox Jews also point to a passage from the Shulchan Aruch, Yoreh De'ah 180:1, that elucidates the biblical passage above as a prohibition against markings beyond the ancient practice, including tattoos. Maimonides concluded that regardless of intent, the act of tattooing is prohibited (Mishneh Torah, Laws of Idolatry 12:11).

Conservative Jews point to the next verse of the Shulchan Aruch (Yoreh De'ah 180:2): "If it [the tattoo] was done in the flesh of another, the one to whom it was done is blameless"  this is used by them to say that tattooing oneself is different from obtaining a tattoo, and that the latter may be acceptable. Orthodox Jews disagree, and read the text as referring to forced tattooing—as was done during the Holocaust—which is not considered a violation of Jewish Law on the part of the victim. In another vein, cutting into the skin to perform surgery and temporary tattooing used for surgical purposes (e.g.: to mark the lines of an incision) are permitted in the Shulhan Arukh 180:3.

In most sectors of the religious Jewish community, having a tattoo does not prohibit participation, and one may be buried in a Jewish cemetery and participate fully in all synagogue ritual.

Reform Jews and Reconstructionist Jews neither condemn nor condone tattooing.

In modern times, the association of tattoos with Nazi concentration camps and the Holocaust has added another level of revulsion to the practice of tattooing, even among many otherwise fairly secular Jews. It is a common misconception that anyone bearing a tattoo is not permitted to be buried in a Jewish cemetery. In modern Israel, secular Jews may choose to get tattoos despite the religious and Holocaust-related taboos.

Mormonism 
Among Mormons, getting a tattoo is not considered sinful, but it is discouraged as it is altering the creation of God.

Christianity-related tattoos are highly common among military veterans and Protestant Evangelicals. The United States Military announced in 2014 that it was easing restrictions on religious tattoos.

Many Christians with tattoos will have a Psalm or verse from the Bible tattooed on their body although some people will still have tattoos from the Bible despite not being Christian. Popular verses include John 3:16, Philippians 4:13, and Psalm 23.

Neopaganism
Neopagans can use the process and the outcome of tattooing as an expression or representation of their beliefs. Many tattooists' websites offer pagan images as examples of the kinds of provided artwork. At least one Wiccan tradition, Blue Star Wicca, uses a tattoo as a mark of Initiation, although it is an entitlement, not a requirement.

References

Sources

External Sources
 Tattos of Tibetan ex-political prisoners Interview with Buddhist monk Palden Gyatso discussing tattoos for monks.

Tattooing and religion